Euphorion (Euphoríōn) was the son of the Greek tragedian Aeschylus, and himself an author of tragedies. In the Dionysia of 431 BCE, Euphorion won 1st prize, defeating both Sophocles (who took 2nd prize) and Euripides, who took 3rd prize with a tetralogy that includes the extant play Medea. He is purported by some to have been the author of Prometheus Bound—previously assumed to be the work of his father, to whom it was attributed at the Library of Alexandria,—for several reasons, chiefly that the playwright's portrayal of Zeus is far less reverent than in other works attributed to Aeschylus, and that  appear in the plays of the comic Aristophanes. This has led  to date it as late as 415 BCE, long after Aeschylus's death. If Euphorion wrote Prometheus Bound, there are as a result five ancient Greek tragedians with one or more fully surviving plays: Aeschylus, Euphorion, Sophocles, Euripides, and possibly the author of the tragedy Rhesus if its attribution to Euripides is incorrect.

References

Ancient Greek poets
5th-century BC Athenians
Ancient Greek dramatists and playwrights
5th-century BC writers
Tragic poets